Long Beach is the ice-free beach on the southwest coast of Nelson Island in the South Shetland Islands, Antarctica, extending 1 km northwards from Ross Point. Its surface area is 24.7 ha. The area was visited by early 19th century sealers.

The beach is named after the American missionary Albert Long (1832-1901) who contributed greatly to the Bulgarian National Revival, and together with Elias Riggs organized the first translation (by Neofit Rilski), printing and dissemination of the Bible in modern Bulgarian language; in association with other Bulgarian historical names in the area.

Location
British mapping of the area in 1968.

Maps
 Livingston Island to King George Island. Scale 1:200000. Admiralty Nautical Chart 1776. Taunton: UK Hydrographic Office, 1968
 South Shetland Islands. Scale 1:200000 topographic map No. 3373. DOS 610 - W 62 58. Tolworth, UK, 1968
 Antarctic Digital Database (ADD). Scale 1:250000 topographic map of Antarctica. Scientific Committee on Antarctic Research (SCAR). Since 1993, regularly upgraded and updated

Notes

References
 Bulgarian Antarctic Gazetteer. Antarctic Place-names Commission. (details in Bulgarian, basic data in English)

External links
 Long Beach. Adjusted Copernix satellite image

Beaches of the South Shetland Islands
Bulgaria and the Antarctic